Aleptina inca is a moth of the family Noctuidae. It is found from south-eastern California east to southern Arizona and western Texas. It is also found in Baja California.

The wingspan is about 19 mm. Adults are on wing from May to October in multiple generations in western Texas.

References

Moths described in 1902
Acronictinae
Moths of North America